Kolkata Gate (officially known as Biswa Bangla Gate) is an arch-monument in the city of New Town, Kolkata, West Bengal, India. It is built by Housing Infrastructure Development Corporation (HIDCO) on the Biswa Bangla Sarani at Narkelbagan, Action Area - I of New Town. It also houses a restaurant. The visitors' gallery and restaurant are surrounded by glass, which will be part of the wall. From here, one can see various parts of New Town.

Location 
Kolkata Gate is located over the third rotary traffic island on Biswa Bangla Sarani, near Rabindra Tirtha in Action Area 1, New Town, Kolkata. It is connected with the Biswa Bangla Convention Centre metro station of Kolkata Metro Line 6.

History and construction

The idea of Kolkata Gate came up under the Newtown beautification project. design was made public in 2015. The construction of the Gate started on 6 March 2017.

The initial plan for the structure also included a Biswa Bangla globe hanging in the centre of the ring. But, while it was being pulled up, the pulley mechanism faulted and it crashed to the ground. No one was injured and it was decided to scrap the idea of globe.

On 2 February 2019, the gate was opened for public by Chief Minister of West Bengal, Mamata Banerjee.

The ring is supported by two parabolic arches from four sides of the intersection.

Structure details 
The ring is supported by two parabolic arches from four corners of the intersection. The four legs stand on concrete foundations  steel was used for the structure. There are two staircases and an elevator to reach the gallery. Decorative paintings of luminaries have been drawn on the wall inside the ring with the outer side having a glass façade to have a view of the township. Maximum 100 visitors are allowed at a time on the ring. Biswa Bangla Gate logo is put up on the outer wall of the ring.

Notes

References

External links 
 

New Town, Kolkata
Tourism in Kolkata
Buildings and structures completed in 2018
Gates in India